Steve Irwin's Wildlife Warriors is an Australian factual television series. It aired on Network Ten on 6 October 2012. It stars Bindi Irwin, Terri Irwin, and Robert C. Irwin. The show is a tribute to Steve Irwin.

External links
 Steve Irwin's Wildlife Warriors
 Australia Zoo Wildlife Warriors

Network 10 original programming
Australian factual television series
2012 Australian television series debuts
2012 Australian television series endings